Grey Nuns stop is a tram stop under construction in the Edmonton Light Rail Transit network in Edmonton, Alberta, Canada. It will serve the Valley Line, and is located on the east side of 66 Street, north of 31 Avenue NW, between Kameyosek and Tawa. The stop was scheduled to open in 2020; however, as of December 2022 the  Valley Line had not opened and no definite opening date had been announced.

Around the station
Grey Nuns Community Hospital
Kameyosek
Tawa

References

External links
TransEd Valley Line LRT

Edmonton Light Rail Transit stations
Railway stations under construction in Canada
Valley Line (Edmonton)